Marnick Danny Ingrid Vermijl  (born 13 January 1992) is a Belgian footballer who plays as a right-back for Belgian National Division 1 side Thes.

Born in Peer, he began his career with nearby Bocholter VV, and joined the academy of Standard Liège in 2008 before being signed by English club Manchester United in 2010. He was unable to break into the Manchester United first-team and spent the 2013–14 season on loan to Dutch club NEC before moving to Sheffield Wednesday on a permanent deal in January 2015. Vermijl is also a Belgium youth international, having played at the under-17, under-18, under-19 and under-21 levels.

Club career

Manchester United
Born in Peer, Vermijl was a youth player of Standard Liège, but did not play for the senior squad before moving to Manchester United for the 2010–11 season, becoming only the second Belgian player to play for the team. He made his debut in a friendly against Shamrock Rovers scoring twice and made 24 appearances for the reserve squad in his first season. He made his professional debut on 26 September 2012, in the League Cup win against Newcastle United at Old Trafford.

NEC
On 2 September 2013, Vermijl joined Dutch team NEC on loan for the duration of the 2013–14 season.

Sheffield Wednesday
Vermijl signed for Sheffield Wednesday on 2 February 2015. The terms of the deal were undisclosed.

Preston North End
Vermijl signed on loan for Preston North End on 6 August 2015. He scored his first goal for the club in a 1-0 win against Premier League side Watford in the League Cup on 25 August 2015.

Vermijl made a permanent move to Preston North End on 31 August 2016, signing a three-year deal.

Scunthorpe United
Vermijl signed on loan for Scunthorpe United on 31 January 2018. He made his first appearance for the Iron on 3 February 2018 in a 2–3 away victory over Fleetwood Town.

MVV Maastricht
Vermijl signed on a season-long loan for Eerste Divisie side MVV Maastricht on 31 August 2018.

He was released by Preston at the end of the 2018–19 season.

Vermijl signed for Maastricht on a permanent deal on 27 June 2019.

Thes Sport 
On 2 July 2020, Vermijl signed with Thes Sport in the third-tier Belgian National Division 1, where he was reunited with his brother, Laurens.

International career
Vermijl has 12 caps and three goals for the Belgian U17 team, nine caps and no goals for the Belgian U18 team, and 14 caps and two goals for the Belgian U19 team.

Career statistics 
Statistics accurate as of 10 July 2017.

Notes

References

External links
Profile at pnefc.net
Voetbal International profile 

 

1992 births
Living people
Belgian footballers
Belgian expatriate footballers
Association football defenders
Manchester United F.C. players
NEC Nijmegen players
Sheffield Wednesday F.C. players
Preston North End F.C. players
Scunthorpe United F.C. players
MVV Maastricht players
Belgium youth international footballers
Belgium under-21 international footballers
Eredivisie players
Eerste Divisie players
Belgian Third Division players
Expatriate footballers in England
Expatriate footballers in the Netherlands
Belgian expatriate sportspeople in England
Belgian expatriate sportspeople in the Netherlands
Footballers from Limburg (Belgium)
English Football League players
K.V.V. Thes Sport Tessenderlo players